Kempt may refer to:

People
 George Kempt (1821–1885), Ontario businessman and political figure
 James Kempt (1765–1854), British Army officer, Lieutenant Governor of Nova Scotia, and Governor General of British North America

Toponyms

Canada 
 Kempt Lake (Matawinie), Matawinie Regional County Municipality, Lanaudière, Quebec
 Kempt, Nova Scotia, a community in the Region of Queens Municipality
 Kempt Shore, Nova Scotia, a small community, in The Municipality of the District of West Hants in Hants County
 Kempt Head, Nova Scotia, a small community in Victoria County on Boularderie Island
 Kempt Road, Nova Scotia, a small community in Richmond County on Cape Breton Island